Pseudomonas anguilliseptica is a Gram-negative bacterium that is pathogenic to fish. It was first isolated from Japanese eels (Anguilla japonica). Based on 16S rRNA analysis, P. anguilliseptica has been placed in the P. aeruginosa group.

References

External links
Type strain of Pseudomonas anguilliseptica at BacDive -  the Bacterial Diversity Metadatabase

Pseudomonadales
Bacteria described in 1972